The Communist League was a Nepalese communist organization founded in Kathmandu in 1946. It is the source group from which the Nepal Red Communist Party came from.

Defunct communist parties in Nepal
Political parties established in 1946
1946 establishments in Nepal